The following highways are numbered 611:

Afghanistan
Route 611

Canada
 Alberta Highway 611
Manitoba Provincial Road 611
 Ontario Highway 611
Saskatchewan Highway 611

Costa Rica
 National Route 611

United States

United Arab Emirates
 E 611 road (United Arab Emirates), also known as the Dubai Bypass Road